Yoshikawa (written: , ,  or  in hiragana) is a Japanese surname. Notable people with the surname include:

, Japanese bureaucrat, statesman and politician
, Japanese gravure idol, actress and AV idol
, Japanese sprinter and long jumper
Christine Yoshikawa (born 1974), Canadian-American classical pianist
, Japanese guitarist
, Japanese baseball player
, Japanese writer
, Japanese politician
, Japanese politician
, Japanese actress, fashion model and singer
, Japanese economist
, Japanese calligrapher
, Japanese footballer
, Japanese sinologist
, Japanese footballer
Mako Yoshikawa (born 1966), American writer
, Japanese fencer
, Japanese cyclist
, Japanese middle- and long-distance runner
, Japanese manga artist
, Japanese basketball player
, Japanese actress
, Japanese baseball player
, Japanese academic and writer 
, Japanese golfer
, Japanese beauty pageant winner
, Japanese politician
, Japanese footballer
, Japanese animator
, Japanese manga artist
, Japanese politician
, Japanese World War II spy
, Japanese footballer
, Japanese baseball player
, Japanese futsal player
, Japanese racing driver
, Japanese footballer
, Japanese photographer
, Japanese motorcycle racer
, Japanese composer, music arranger and film producer
, Japanese sport shooter

Fictional characters
, a character in the manga series YuruYuri
, a character in the novel series Sound! Euphonium

Japanese-language surnames